The 1998 Philippine presidential and vice presidential elections were held on May 11, 1998. In the presidential election, Vice President Joseph Estrada won a six-year term as President by a landslide victory. In the vice-presidential race, Senator Gloria Macapagal Arroyo won a six-year term as Vice President, also by a landslide victory. This was the third election where both the president and vice president came from different parties.

Background
At the tail-end of the presidency of Fidel V. Ramos, several politicians have been jockeying for the nomination of his Lakas-NUCD-UMDP party. This included Speaker Jose de Venecia Jr., Defense Secretary Renato de Villa, and Cebu Governor Lito Osmeña.

The Lakas nominee is widely expected to face Vice President Joseph Estrada, who had been leading candidate in the various opinion polls. Estrada had earlier declared in 1992 that he will not run for president, stating that he intends to retire when he reaches the age of 60 in 1998, but he later recanted this decision.

Senator Miriam Defensor Santiago, who considered herself to have been cheated out of the presidency by Ramos in 1992, was also expected to run again.

Former First Lady Imelda Marcos was also seen to run for the presidency. She was banking on the support of loyalists of deposed president Ferdinand Marcos.

Senator Gloria Macapagal Arroyo, who had topped the 1995 Senate election, was also seen to be a strong contender to the presidency, founding the Kabalikat ng Malayang Pilipino party, with Tito Sotto, who himself topped the 1992 Senate election, widely seen to be her vice presidential running mate.

Senator Raul Roco, who had a noteworthy Senate career up to this point, had the strong backing of the youth via his Aksyon Demokratiko party.

The Lakas convention nominated de Venecia, Ramos handpicked successor. This led to de Villa and Osmeña bolting from Lakas and setting up their own parties. De Venecia picked Arroyo as his running mate.

The Liberal Party nominated Manila mayor Alfredo Lim. Meanwhile, the Laban ng Demokratikong Pilipino (LDP), Nationalist People's Coalition (NPC) and Estrada's own Partido ng Masang Pilipino (the forerunner of the Pwersa ng Masang Pilipino) established an electoral pact and formed the Laban ng Makabayang Masang Pilipino. Estrada chose Senator Edgardo Angara of the LDP as his running mate.

Weeks before election day, Marcos withdrew from the election. Estrada had widened his lead among other candidates at this point.

Candidates

Opinion polling 
Social Weather Stations was the primary pollster in the country in 1998.

For vice president

Results

The 10th Congress canvassed the votes in joint session for a number of days before declaring Estrada and Arroyo as the winners; with Senate President Neptali Gonzales and Speaker De Venecia announcing the victors.

While the official canvassing did not start a fortnight after Election Day, the National Movement for Free Elections (NAMFREL) held a parallel and unofficial quick count which was released days after the election and was updated at irregular intervals. NAMFREL based their tally from the seventh copy of the election returns given to them.

In theory, the totals for the official canvassing (derived from the certificates of canvass, which are then derived from the election returns) and the completed NAMFREL quick count should be equal.

For president
Estrada carried the majority of the provinces, his hometown of San Juan City, and Metro Manila. 

De Venecia carried his home province of Pangasinan as well as Baguio, Roco carried his home province of Camarines Sur and the rest of the Bicol Region (excluding Masbate), and Osmeña got his foothold over his home province of Cebu and other provinces in the South.

Other candidates also carried their home provinces such as De Villa of Batangas and Siquijor, Enrile of Cagayan and Iloilo City, and Defensor Santiago of Iloilo Province, as well as Tawi-Tawi and Bacolod. Lim was the only major candidate who did not carry any provinces (with the exception of Batanes) and failed to capture his hometown of Manila.

NAMFREL quick count
Take note that Manuel Morato had a higher number of votes in the NAMFREL quick count than in the official congressional canvass.
*Difference from the NAMFREL quick count from the official congressional canvass.

Voter demographics

Source: Exit polls conducted by Social Weather Stations on May 12, 100% total (margin of error: 1.3%)

For vice-president
Arroyo also carried most of the provinces including her home province of Pampanga. Other candidates also carried their home provinces such as Angara of Aurora and Quezon being mother province, Tatad of Catanduanes and Sueno of South Cotabato.

Only Orbos of Pangasinan and Osmeña of Cebu failed to capture the votes of their home provinces.

NAMFREL quick count
Take note that Reynaldo Pacheco had a higher number of votes in the NAMFREL quick count than the official Congressional canvass.
*Difference from the NAMFREL quick count from the official Congressional canvass.

Voter demographics

Source: Exit polls conducted by Social Weather Stations on May 12, 100% total (margin of error: 1.4%)

See also 
 Commission on Elections
 Politics of the Philippines
 Philippine elections
 President of the Philippines
 11th Congress of the Philippines

Notes

References

External links 
 The Philippine Presidency Project
 Official website of the Commission on Elections
 Official website of the House of Representatives

1998
1998 elections in the Philippines